Brian Nugent (born 1 November 1978 in Cookstown, Northern Ireland) is a cycling coach.  He is known as Cycling Ireland’s track coach for women and paracyclists.

References

British male cyclists
1978 births
Living people
People from Cookstown
Irish male cyclists
Cycling coaches
Paralympic cycling coaches